The French National Railways used to run a considerable number of  lines, a few of which still operate mostly in tourist areas, such as the St Gervais-Vallorcine (Alps) and the "Petit Train Jaune" (little yellow train) in the Pyrenees. The original French scheme was that every sous-prefecture should be rail connected. Extensive  gauge lines were also built for the sugar-beet industry in the north often using ex-military equipment after the First World War. Decauville was a famous French manufacturer of industrial narrow-gauge railway equipment and equipped one of the most extensive regional  narrow-gauge railway, the Chemins de fer du Calvados. Corsica has a narrow-gauge network of two lines following the coast line, that are connected by one line crossing the island through highly mountainous terrain. The petit train d'Artouste, a tourist line in the Pyrenees, uses  gauge.

Narrow-gauge funiculars

 Funiculars of Lyon

 Funiculaire du Perce-Neige
 Funival

 Funiculaire de Thonon-les-Bains

 Grand-Hôtel du Cap-Ferrat funicular; operating

Belleville funicular tramway (1891-1924)
 Chemin de fer d'Anvin à Calais (1881-1955)
 Chemin de fer de Boulogne à Bonningues (1900-48)
 Chemin de fer de La Mure (1888-2010)
 Chemin de fer des Côtes-du-Nord (1905-56)
 Chemin de fer du Blanc-Argent
 Chemin de fer du Cambrésis (1881-1960)
 Chemin de fer du Finistère (1893-1946)
 Chemin de fer du Montenvers
 Chemin de fer du Vivarais
 Chemins de Fer d'Aire à Fruges et de Rimeux-Gournay à Berck (1891-1955)
 Chemins de fer de la Corse
 Chemins de fer de Provence
 Chemins de fer du Morbihan (1902-48)
 Funiculaire de Pau
 Funiculaire de Saint-Hilaire du Touvet
 Funiculaire du Pic du Jer
 Funiculars of Lyon
 Ligne de Cerdagne
 Petit train de la Rhune
 PO Corrèze (1904-70)
 Réseau Albert (1889-1955)
 Réseau Breton
 Réseau des Bains de Mer (1887-1951)
 Chemin de fer de la Baie de Somme
 Saint-Étienne tramway
 Saint-Gervais–Vallorcine railway
 Train des pignes
 Tramway d'Avranches (1907-14)
 Tramway à vapeur d'Ardres à Pont d'Ardres (1902-55)
 Tramway du Mont-Blanc 
 Tramways Électrique du Finistère (1903-32)

CF Economiques Forestiers des Landes (1907-34)

; 6.1 km, operating

Chemin de Fer de la Vallée de l'Ouche;
 Chemin de Fer de Saint-Eutrope; 2.5 km, defunct
 ; 5.5 km, operating
 Chemin de Fer des Combes; operating
 ; 4 km, operating
 ; 1.3 km, operating
 Chemin de fer du Val de Passey at Choloy-Ménillot
 Chemins de fer du Calvados; (1891-1944)
 Compagnie du chemin de fer de Semur en Vallon
 Conservatoire provençal de patrimoine de véhicules anciens 
 Froissy Dompierre Light Railway; operating
 Le petit train de Bligny sur Ouche
 ; 2.5 km, operating
 ; 6 km, operating
 ; 3 km, operating
 
 ; 2.5 km, operating
 ; 3 km, operating
 ; 1.8 km, operating
 Tramway de Deauville; (1876-1905)
 Tramway de Pithiviers à Toury; 80 km, part (30 km) operating as a heritage railway
 
 
 Tramway de Royan
 Tramway du Cap-Ferret; operating
 
 Trianon tramway; (1906-11)
 Towing tramway along the Marne-Rhine Canal between Arzviller and Niderviller.

Chemin de Fer Touristique du Tarn; original gauge 
 Jardin d'Acclimatation railway
 Petit train d'Artouste

Train de l'Andorge en Cevennes

See also

 Decauville
 Trench railways
 Voie ferrée d'intérêt local
 Voie Sacrée, see Le Chemin de Fer Meusien

References

Notes

Bibliography

External links